"" is the fourth single by Shiori Takei. It was released on the 6th of July, 2005 under the Giza Studio label. The single reached #99 rank first week. It charted for 2 weeks and sold over 2,208 copies.

Track listing

References

2005 singles
2005 songs
Being Inc. singles
Giza Studio singles
Songs written by Aika Ohno